Zultanite is a gem variety of the mineral diaspore, mined in the İlbir Mountains of southwest Turkey at an elevation of over 4,000 feet. Turkey is the only place where the mineral can be found.

Depending on its light source, zultanite's color varies between a yellowish green, light gold, and purplish pink. Its color can be pastel green in outdoor light and beige pink in incandescent light.

Zultanite has a hardness of 6.5 to 7.

References

Gemstones
Trademarks